Yemi Eberechi Alade (born 13 March 1989), is a Nigerian Afropop singer, songwriter, actress and activist. She won the Peak Talent Show in 2009 after which she signed to Effyzzie Music Group, and had a hit with her single "Johnny" in 2014. Since then Yemi has gained prominence in the music industry and considered one of the biggest artists in Africa. Following the releases of her albums King of Queens and Mama Africa with huge commercial success recorded for both albums,  she embarked on world tours consecutively.

Alade released her debut album King of Queens on 2 October 2014, and the album produced her most successful single Johnny and other singles like "Kissing", "Tangerine" and "Taking Over Me" featuring Phyno. The album was nominated for Album of the year at the 2015 Nigerian Entertainment Awards and the 2015 Headies Awards. On 25 March 2016, Alade released her second album titled Mama Africa which produced singles like "Na Gode", "TumBum" and "Ferrari". Mama Africa won the World beat Album on the 2016 Independent Music Awards.

In 2016, she debuted on Billboard as No 4 on "Next Big Sound" Chart

She won the MTV African Music Awards for Best female in 2015 and 2016 consecutively and was nominated for Artiste of the Year in 2015, making her the first female to win the MAMAs for Best female consecutively twice and nominated for Artiste of the Year. In 2015, Alade was the first African female to be nominated for the MTV Europe Music Awards (EMAs) and She was nominated for the BET awards for Best International Act: Africa in 2015 and 2016. Alade is also applauded for her creative and overwhelming stage performances, fashion and music videos, She has won The Headies Award for Best Performer twice, 2018 and 2019. The slot was initiated at The Headies 2018 and she was the first artiste to win the category. Alade is also the second Nigerian and Afrobeats artist and the first female to hit 100 million views for a single video on YouTube after Davido. She also has the record for the most viewed female African music video and the first Nigerian female artist to hit 1million views on YouTube in 24 hours.

Alade sings in English, Igbo, Pidgin, Yoruba, French, Swahili and Portuguese. Her music has been of influence in many African countries and the world as she is acclaimed "Mama Africa" for her versatility in using different African languages and attires in her songs and music videos. Alade's father was a police commissioner of Yoruba descent, while her mother is of Igbo descent.

On 9 June 2020, Alade was mentioned to be among the forefront artists/musicians from across the world to perform at The Global Goal: Unite for our future sponsored by the Global Citizen aimed to highlight the disproportionate impact of the COVID-19 pandemic especially in the most remote places in Africa and across the world. On 27 June 2020, Yemi Alade performed in the Global Goal: Unite for Our future alongside Miley Cyrus, Shakira, J Balvin, Jennifer Hudson, Coldplay, Usher, Justin Bieber, Quavo, Christine and the Queens and Chloe X Halle.

In 2022, The Scoove Africa ranked Yemi Alade The Best Stage Performer in Nigeria to date.

Early life
Alade was raised in a multi-ethnic home from Nigeria, Her father James Alade was a commissioner of police from Ondo State, Nigeria while her mother Helen Uzoma is a native of Abia State, Nigeria. According to Yemi, She taps from the Igbo and Yoruba ethnicities of her parents. Alade attended secondary School at Victory Grammar School, Ikeja, and the University of Lagos, (both in Lagos, Nigeria) 

 During her university education, Alade took part in a TV talent show called Peak Talent Show where she emerged winner. That was Alade's debut appearance on TV and where she gained popularity. She was then signed to Effyzzie Music Group.

Music career

2014–2016: King of Queens and Mama Africa

Alade's debut studio album King of Queens was released on 2 October 2014. Alade collaborated with producers such as Selebobo, Sizzle Pro, Shady Bizniz, Philkeyz, Young D, GospelOnDeBeatz, DIL, OJB Jezreel, Mr Chidoo, Fliptyce, EL Mcee and Beat Nation. The album was preceded by the singles "Johnny", "Tangerine" and "Kissing". It features guest appearances and skits from Bovi, R2Bees, Phyno, Chidinma, DIL, Selebobo and Diamond Platnumz. Alade promoted the album by touring several African countries, including Ghana, Kenya and South Africa. The album's deluxe edition was released in November 2014; it contains French versions of songs originally performed in English. The cover art for the deluxe edition was unveiled on 21 October 2014. According to the music platform A Nation of Billions, King of Queens sold over 100,000 copies.

Alade's second studio album Mama Africa was released on 25 March 2016. Alade disclosed its title was Mama Africa and said it would focus on the strengths and weaknesses of an African woman. The album combines elements of Afropop, highlife, R&B, coupé-décalé, hip-hop and pop. Alade said recording the album was a struggle because she was constantly traveling to different countries every day. She also said she recorded the album to "capture all of Africa in one CD". Alade told The Fader magazine she collaborated with artists from West Africa, East Africa and South Africa. She enlisted GospelOnDeBeatz, DJ Coublon, Selebobo, Philkeyz, BeatsByEmzo, Masterkraft, Rotimi Keys and Mr. Chidoo to produce the album. Mama Africa features guest appearances from P-Square, Sarkodie, Sauti Sol, Flavour N'abania, Rotimi Keys, DJ Arafat and Selebobo. It was made available for pre-order on iTunes a week before its official release. Alade announced that proceeds from the sale of the album will go to the Feed a Child charity initiative.  The album's deluxe edition was released on 6 April 2016, and features collaborations with South African musicians Bucie and AKA. Mama Africa charted in Germany, Malaysia and France.

2017–2019: Black Magic, Woman of Steel, Universal Music and Endorsements

Alade's third studio album Black Magic was released on 15 December 2017. A follow-up to her 2017 EP Mama Afrique, the album features guest appearances from Falz and Olamide. Black Magic was made available for pre-order in November 2017. Prior to disclosing the album's title, Alade posted the acronym BM on social media and wanted her fans to guess its meaning. The album was produced by DJ Coublon, Vtek, Sarz, Krizbeatz, Young D, Sess, Fliptyce, IAmBeat, Philkeyz, 2Kriss and Echo. It was supported by the previously released singles "Knack Am", "Single & Searching" and "Heart Robber". The album received generally negative reviews from music critics, who panned its lyrics and Alade's songwriting.
Prior to that, On 9 May 2017, Alade was announced as a coach in the second edition of The Voice Nigeria to replace 2baba who was a former coach on the live show. She coached on The Voice Nigeria (Season 2) alongside other Nigerian artists like Waje, Timi Dakolo and Patoranking.

On 1 December 2017, Alade was featured on a campaign "Make The Future" by Shell Oil Company in Nigeria. She was also starred in the company's music video "On Top of the World" which also featured Jennifer Hudson, Pixie Lott, Luan Santana and Monali Thakur.

On 29 April 2019, Alade garnered one million views on her "Oh My Gosh" remix featuring Rick Ross in one day. This makes the release from Alade, one of the fastest views gainers in the history of African music and the fastest release by an African female act. In July 2019, Alade became the first African female artist to reach one million subscribers on YouTube. Her song "Johnny" currently holds the YouTube record for the most watched African Female music video of all time. Alade was featured on "Don't Jealous Me", a track from Beyoncé's soundtrack album The Lion King: The Gift. She appeared on the track alongside Mr Eazi and Tekno. Rolling Stone magazine revealed that Alade also recorded a verse for an earlier version of "My Power" in June.

 

Alade released her fourth studio album Woman of Steel on 30 August 2019. Alade describes the album as a "buffet with different kinds of meals and drinks". She named the album Woman of Steel to reflect her tough veneer to command the same degree of respect as her male counterparts. Moreover, she derived the title after coming to the realization that she is her own superhero. Musically, Woman of Steel is an Afrobeat record that incorporates elements of R&B and highlife. The album primarily explores topics such as love, socio-politics and poverty. Alade spent three years recording the album and said it would be released on 30 August 2019. The album's cover art features Alade wearing a headcap inspired by the Nefertiti Bust artwork. Artists featured on Woman of Steel include Rick Ross, Duncan Mighty, Angélique Kidjo and Funke Akindele. In an interview with The Star newspaper, Alade sang some of the songs that made the album were recorded the previous year while others were recorded in August.

In September 2019, Alade signed a multi-year licensing deal with Universal Music Africa (UMA) and UMG France. UMA will serve as the exclusive worldwide record partner for Alade while UMG France will serve as the international rollout partner for all of her releases under the label.

Over the years, Alade received multiple ambassadorial contracts and partnerships from different brands both locally and internationally. She was endorsed by brands like Luc Belaire, Glo, Maybelline, Shell and many more.

2020-Present: Black Is King and Empress

On 16 January 2020, Alade was announced the new brand ambassador for Hollandia Yoghurt.

Yemi Alade starred on Beyoncé's Black Is King  visual trailer and was announced to be featured in the movie released and premiered on Disney+ on 31 July 2020, then premiered for African countries on DStv Mnet on 1 August 2020.

On 25 August 2020, Alade was announced to be among the coaches participating in The Voice Nigeria Season 3 alongside Waje, Darey and Falz, Alade is also one of the returning coaches from The Voice Nigeria (Season 2) alongside Waje

On 17 November 2020, Alade announced the release of her fifth studio album titled Empress. She released the tracklist and the cover art of the album and slated the release for 20 November 2020. The album contains 15 tracks and it features guest appearances and collaborations from the Grammy award-winning Estelle, Vegedream, Patoranking, Rudeboy, Mzansi Youth Choir and Dadju. She also enlisted Vtek, Phil Keyz, Egar Boi, Dr. Amir, Krizbeatz, IamBeatz, Youp Boelen, Jimmy Huru and Yung Felix as producers of the album. The guitarists she likewise enlisted are Fiokee and Max Meurs. The album received positive critical acclaim and has the most singles of all Alade's album. On 13 August 2021 Yemi Alade released her second EP Queendoncom with seven singles. It was an all solo album as Alade featured no guest appearances on the project.

Advocacy
Yemi Alade has engaged in advocacy programs over the years of her music career.

On 7 November 2018, Alade visited her secondary school Victory Grammar School, Ikeja which she also engaged in charity work. She helped the students who had difficulty in eyesight with equipment to help them  see clearly. She engaged into this through her foundation (Helen and James Pathway Foundation).

On 15 November 2019, Alade was featured on The Nairobi Summit on ICPD25  for the movement A Global Call to Action for handicapped children in Kenya. She performed alongside Chawki

2020: COVID-19 advocacy
In 2020, Alade joined the United Nations Development Programme to speak for protection and aiding of poor people across Africa affected by the corona virus pandemic. She also was featured in the campaign Unite for the Future by Global Citizen In partnership with Nelson Mandela Foundation and MTV Base, Alade joined One Campaign on a movement Stand Together against Covid-19 She was featured on the campaign song "Stand Together" which collaborated with other African artistes like 2Baba, Ahmed Soultan, Ben Pol, Teni, Amanda Black, Stanley Enow, Gigi La Mayne, Prodigio and Betty G

On 23 September 2020, Yemi Alade was appointed a Goodwill ambassador for the United Nations Development Programme (UNDP) by the organization's administrator Achim Steiner. She pledged with the UNDP that her focuses on Sustainable Development Goals would be on inequality, empowering women and creating awareness for the impact of global climate change. On 30 October 2020, Alade performed her singles "True Love" and "Africa" at the TED virtual countdown global launch. The countdown is TED's initiative to accelerate solutions to climate crisis around the world. Before her performance, Alade spoke about being part of the community that challenges one another to finding ways to reduce carbon emissions globally.

2021 
Ever since Alade's appointment as a United Nations Development Programme ambassador, Her activism for the Sustainable Development Goals has increased as she has engaged in programmes and events that will help posit change to a better environment and gender based violence.

On 17 October 2021, Alade performed at the Earthshot Prize ceremony which took place at the Alexandra Palace, London at the invitation of the Royal family (The Duke and Duchess of Cambridge). The event is hosted by the Royal foundation and aimed to distribute prizes and awards to five individuals each year who help the environment substantially. Alade performed alongside Ed Sheeran, Shawn Mendes, Cold Play and KSI. According to Alade, The Royal family personally selected her song "Rain" to be performed at the event.

On 2 March 2022, Alade was announced as the global ambassador of a Pan-African campaign called "It's Up To Us" in partnership with the Africa Centre For Disease Control and the MasterCard Foundation to encourage Africans get vaccinated against COVID-19.

Legacy 
Yemi Alade has been mentioned by many artists like Tems, Ayra Starr, Guchi and Busiswa as an inspiration, mentor and role model.

Tours
Yemi Alade has gone on five world tours following her studio albums:

King of Queens Tour.
Mama Africa Tour. 
 Black Magic Tour.
 Woman of Steel Tour.
Empress Tour.

Discography

Albums 

 King of Queens (2015)
 Mama Africa (2016)
 Black Magic (2017)
 Woman of Steel (2019)
 Empress (2020)

Extended plays 
 Mama Afrique (2017)
Queendoncom (2021)
 African Baddie (2022)

Filmography

Film

Television

Awards and nominations

African Entertainment Awards USA (AEAUSA)

|-
|2018 African Entertainment Awards USA|2018
|Herself
|Female Artist of the Year
|
|-
|2019
|Herself
|Best Female Artist
|
|-
|2019
|Herself
|Entertainer of the year
|
|-
|2020
|Herself
|Best Female Artist 
|
|-
|2020
|"Shekere" featuring Angelique Kidjo
|Best Collaboration of the Year
|
|-
|2020
|Herself
|Entertainer of the Year
|
|-
|2020
|Herself
|Best Female artist (West Africa)
|
|-
|2021
|Herself
|Artist of the year
|
|-
|2021
|Herself
|Best female artist 
|
|-
|2021
|Herself
|Best female artist (West Africa)
|

AFRIMA Awards (All Africa Music Awards)

|-
|2015
|"Kissing"
|Best Female Artiste in Western Africa
|

|-
|2018
|"Herself"
|Best Female Artiste
|
|-
|2019
|"Oh My Gosh" 
|Best Female Artiste in Western Africa
|

AFRIMMA Awards (African Muzik Magazine Awards)

|-
|2020
|Herself
|Best Female Western Africa
|
|-
|2020
|Herself
|Best Live Act
|
|-
|2019
|Herself
|Artiste of the Year
|
|-
|2019
|Herself
|Best Live Act
|
|-
|2018
|"Oh My Gosh"
|Best Female Western Africa
|

MTV African Music Awards

|-
|2015
|Herself
|Best Female 
|
|-
|2016
|Herself
|Best Female 
|
|-
|2016
|Herself
|Artiste of the Year
|

MTV Europe Music Awards

|-
|2015
|Herself
|Best African Act
|

Soundcity MVP Awards

|-
|2020
|Herself
|Best Female
|
|-
|2020
|Herself
|African Artiste of the Year
|
|-
|2020
|Herself
|Digital Artiste of the Year
|
|-
|2019
|Herself
|Best Female
|
|-
|2019
|Herself
|Best Pop
|
|-
|2019
|Herself
|Digital Artiste of the Year
|
|-
|2019
|Herself
|African Artiste of the Year
|
|-
|2018
|Herself
|Best Female
|
|-
|2018
|Herself
|Best Pop
|
|-
|2018
|Herself
|Digital Artiste of the Year
|
|-
|2018
|Herself
|African Artiste of the Year
|
|-
|2017
|Herself
|Best Female
|
|-
|2017
|Herself
|Digital Artiste of the Year
|
|-
|2016
|Herself
|Best Female
|
|-
|2016
|Herself
|Best Pop
|
|-
|2016
|Herself
|African Artiste of the Year
|

Independent Music Awards

|-
|2016
|Mama Africa
|Best Album-World Beat
|

BET Awards

|-
|2015
|Herself
|Best International Act: Africa 
|
|-
|2016
|Herself
|Best International Act
|

Nigeria Entertainment Awards

|-
|2014
|Herself
|Female Artist of the Year
|
|-
|2015
|Herself
|Female artiste of the year
|
|-
|2015
|Herself
|Best Live Performer
|
|-
|2016
|Herself
|Best Live Performer 
|

City People Entertainment Awards

|-
|2014
|Herself
|Female Musician of the Year
|

MOBO Awards

|-
|2014
|Herself
|Best African Act
|

YEM Awards

|-
|2012
|Herself
|Female Artiste of the Year
|

ELOY Awards

|-
|2013
|Herself
|Most Promising Female
|

WatsUp TV Africa Music Video Awards

!Ref
|-
|rowspan="7"|2016
|rowspan="5"|Want You
|African Video of the Year
|
|
|-
|Best African Female Video
|
|
|-
|Best West African Video
|
|
|-
|Best Afro Pop Video
|
|
|-
|Best African Dance Video
|
|
|-
|rowspan="3"|Ferrari
|Best African Traditional Video
|
|
|-

The Headies

|-
|2019
|rowspan="3"|Herself
|rowspan="2"|Best Performer
|
|-
|2018
|
|-
|2017
|Best Performer
|
|-
|2016
|Herself
|Artiste of the Year
|
|-
|2015
|Herself
|Hip Hop World Revelation of the Year
|
|-
|2015
|"Duro Timi"
|Best Vocal Performance (Female)
|
|-
|2015
|Herself
|Artiste of the Year
|
|-
|2015
|King of Queens
|Album of the Year
|
|-
|2015
|King of Queens
|Best R&B/Pop Album
|

NET Honours 

|-
|2021
|Herself
|Most Popular Musician
|

See also
List of Nigerian musicians

References

External links

 

Nigerian women pop singers
University of Lagos alumni
Musicians from Abia State
Musicians from Ondo State
1989 births
Living people
Nigerian rhythm and blues singers
Yoruba women musicians
Igbo musicians
English-language singers from Nigeria
Yoruba-language singers
21st-century Nigerian women singers
Nigerian women singer-songwriters
The Headies winners
Universal Music Group artists
BBC 100 Women
Swahili-language singers
Portuguese-language singers
United Nations Development Programme officials